Handmade: Britain's Best Woodworker is a BBC reality show that began airing on Channel 4 on 21 October 2021. In the show, woodworkers compete to be named "Britain's Best Woodworker".  A spin-off of the format of The Great British Bake Off, the programme is presented by Mel Giedroyc, with judges Alex de Rijke and Helen Welch (series 1), and Tom Dyckhoff and Sophie Sellu (series 2).  The second series began airing on Channel 4 in September 2022.

Outside of the UK, the programme is marketed as Good with Wood: Britain's Best Woodworker.
Hostile Planet and Tiny World producer Plimsoll Productions took its Channel 4 carpentry format Handmade: Britain’s Best Woodworker to the U.S. as Channel 4 issues a rare double season order.

Series format
The show format is similar to The Great British Bake Off in that each episode features challenges that are to be completed within a certain time period. The series starts with eight woodworkers, usually with one being eliminated each episode. In the Big Build challenge, the woodworkers are given two days to create a specific item. In the Skills Test, held part way through the Big Build, woodworkers are tasked with making an object which requires a specific woodworking skill. The winner of that challenge wins immunity from elimination for that episode.

Series overview

Series 1 (2021)

The first series of Handmade: Britain’s Best Woodworker started on 21 October 2021 and aired for six episodes concluding on 25 November 2021. There were eight woodworkers. The series was hosted by Mel Giedroyc, with judges Alex de Rijke and Helen Welch.  Filming took place at the Glanusk Estate in the Brecon Beacons National Park. The final was won by Misti Leitz, with Charlie and Radha as runners up.

Series 2 (2022)

The second series of Handmade: Britain’s Best Woodworker started on 21 September 2022, and aired for eight episodes concluding on 9 November 2022. The programme commenced with 10 woodworkers, one of whom was replaced after the first episode.  The series was again hosted by Mel Giedroyc, with there being two new judges; Tom Dyckhoff and Sophie Sellu. Filming again took place at the Glanusk Estate in the Brecon Beacons National Park. The final was won by Lauren Wood, with Chloe and Jacob as runners up.

Transmissions

Series

International versions

Broadcast
 New Zealand - broadcast since 2021 on TVNZ

See also
All That Glitters: Britain's Next Jewellery Star
The Great British Bake Off
The Great British Sewing Bee
The Great Pottery Throw Down

References

External links
 Britain's Best Woodworker
 
 

 
2021 British television series debuts
2020s British television series
Channel 4 reality television shows
Channel 4 game shows
British television spin-offs
English-language television shows
Reality television spin-offs
Woodworking
Reality competition television series